Karanikolica (Macedonian and) is a mountain peak in Kosovo and North Macedonia. The peak is found in the Šar Mountains. Two mountain lakes are found under Karanikolica's peak.

The first known ski-descent of Karanikolica was on 6 February 2016. The group was led by local mountain guides Kostantin Ciriviri and Jovan Bozinovski, while the rest of the party was made up of two female ski mountaineers from Norway and Slovakia, and a male splitboarder from the United Kingdom.

External links
 Information

Annotations

References

Two-thousanders of Kosovo
Two-thousanders of North Macedonia
Šar Mountains
Kosovo–North Macedonia border